Thiruvananthapuram Development Authority, commonly abbreviated as TRIDA, is a body of the Government of Kerala that was constituted for the implementation of planned and scientific development of Thiruvananthapuram city and adjoining area. TRIDA presently has jurisdiction over the area comprised in the Thiruvananthapuram Corporation and 5 surrounding Panchayats - Vilappil, Vilavoorkkal, Pallichal, Kalliyoor and Venganoor. 

TRIDA was constituted in the year 1980 under the Travancore Town Planning Act.

Currently, a General Council with 21 members and an Executive Committee with 11 members governs the functioning of the Authority.

References

External links
 

State urban development authorities of India
State agencies of Kerala
Government of Thiruvananthapuram
1980 establishments in Kerala
Government agencies established in 1980